Carrouges is a commune in the Orne department in north-western France.

The inhabitants are known as Carrougiens and Carrougiennes. The town is home to a castle (Château de Carrouges), built in the 14th century by Jean de Carrouges and restored after the Hundred Years War.

History
In the Middle Ages, Carrouges was part of the deanery of Asnebec.  In 1490, under King Charles VIII, Jean de Blosset, Lord of Carrouges and grand marshal of Normandy, founded on his land, with its castle, a college (dedicated to Our Lady of Good Comfort) six canons payments the appointment of the lord who was also the collateur profits. These payments were estimated in 1698 to 200 pounds in Memory of the General Alençon by the intendant, M. de Pommereuil.  It is also stated in 1698, that a court called "breadbasket tax" (related to gabelle paid on the salt) was located in Carrouges.

During the French Revolution of 1789, the town was called "Carrouges-la-Montagne". In  August 1944, occupied by German forces, the city was liberated by the troops of the 3rd U.S. armored division, following the deeds of  Mayor Geslain, who after being released from the German soldiers who had arrested him, indicated the positions of the Germans to the Americans.

Notable people
 

Philippe Tranchant (born 1956), retired professional footballer

See also
Communes of the Orne department
Parc naturel régional Normandie-Maine

References

Communes of Orne